Talkshow with Spike Feresten was an American late-night talk show television program on Fox starring Spike Feresten that aired from September 16, 2006 to May 16, 2009. It was the longest-running late night talk show in Fox's history, with three seasons.

History
The show debuted on September 16, 2006 with guests Andy Richter and Arctic Monkeys. On May 7, 2007 the show was renewed for a second season, making it the longest-running talk show on Fox.

Episodes

See also
List of late night network TV programs

References

External links
 

2006 American television series debuts
2009 American television series endings
2000s American late-night television series
2000s American television talk shows
English-language television shows
Fox late-night programming
Television series by 20th Century Fox Television